Elizabeth "Betty" Alexandra Snowball (9 July 1908 – 13 December 1988) was an English sportswoman.  She played international cricket in the England women's cricket team, and also played international squash and lacrosse for Scotland. She appeared in 10 Test matches between 1934 and 1949, playing as a right-handed batter and wicket-keeper.  She scored 189 runs in 222 minutes playing against New Zealand at Christchurch in February 1935, the fourth women's Test match to be played, setting a world record for the highest individual innings in women's Test cricket which was not surpassed for over 50 years, until Sandhya Agarwal scored 190 in 1986.  It remains the highest Test score by an Englishwoman. She played domestic cricket for various teams, including West of England, Hampshire and Lancashire.

Snowball was born in Burnley, Lancashire.  Her father, Thomas Snowball, was a doctor from Scotland.  She was educated at St Leonards School in St Andrews and then Bedford Physical Training College.  She became a teacher of physical education at St Swithun's School, Winchester.

Her father was an active club cricketer, and encouraged his daughter to play at school.  She became an opening batter and wicketkeeper, and was coached for a period by Learie Constantine.  She played in 10 Test matches for England from 1934 to 1949, including each of the first seven Tests played by women, from the first women's Test against Australia in Brisbane in December 1934 to the seventh against Australia at The Oval in July 1937, where she narrowly missed scoring a second century, being dismissed for 99.  She toured to Australia twice, in 1934–35 and 1948–49, and her efficient wicket-keeping was likened to Bert Oldfield.  She scored 613 runs at a batting average of 40.86.  Behind the stumps, she took 13 catches and 8 stumpings.

After her cricketing career, she retired to Colwall in Herefordshire to teach cricket and mathematics at The Elms School, where Michael Singleton was headmaster.  She died in Colwall.

References

 Carol Salmon, ‘Snowball, Elizabeth Alexandra [Betty] (1908–1988)’, Oxford Dictionary of National Biography, Oxford University Press, 2004 accessed 12 August 2015

External links
 
 

1908 births
1988 deaths
England women Test cricketers
English cricket umpires
People educated at St Leonards School
Scottish lacrosse players
Scottish female squash players
Cricketers from Burnley
English women referees and umpires
West women cricketers
Hampshire women cricketers
Lancashire women cricketers